The 2012–13 Football League Championship (known as the npower Championship for sponsorship reasons) was the ninth season of the league under its current title and twentieth season under its current league division format. The season began on 17 August 2012 with promotion candidates Cardiff City hosting newly promoted Huddersfield Town at Cardiff City Stadium and finished on 27 May 2013 with the play-off final.

Of the 24 teams which participate, eighteen of these remain following the 2011–12 Football League Championship. They were joined by Charlton Athletic, Sheffield Wednesday and Huddersfield Town from 2011–12 Football League One, and Blackburn Rovers, Bolton Wanderers and Wolverhampton Wanderers from the 2011–12 Premier League. The final place was decided on 26 May 2012, as Huddersfield Town defeated Sheffield United 8–7 on penalties, in the 2012 Football League One play-off final.

Cardiff City won the league in their first season since a controversial rebrand; they achieved promotion to the top flight for the first time since 1960 and became the second Welsh club to play in the Premier League. The second automatic promotion spot was won by Hull City with a 2–2 draw against Cardiff on the final day after a dramatic finale to the season. Watford, just two points behind, had to settle for a place in the playoffs, joining Brighton & Hove Albion, Crystal Palace, and Leicester City, who secured their place with a last-minute goal over rivals Nottingham Forest. In the playoffs, Watford defeated Leicester City 3–2, Crystal Palace defeated Brighton 2–0, and in the final Watford was upset by Crystal Palace to gain the promotion. Bristol City, Wolverhampton Wanderers, and Peterborough United were relegated. Peterborough gained 54 points, the highest ever for a relegated team in Championship history. Wolves' relegation was the first time a team had been relegated from the top tier to the third tier in consecutive seasons since Swindon Town in 1994 and 1995. They also became the first team to achieve this feat twice.

Changes from last season

Team changes

To Championship
Promoted from League One
 Charlton Athletic
 Sheffield Wednesday
 Huddersfield Town

Relegated from Premier League
 Wolverhampton Wanderers
 Blackburn Rovers
 Bolton Wanderers

From Championship
Promoted to Premier League
 Reading
 Southampton
 West Ham United

Relegated to League One
 Doncaster Rovers
 Coventry City
 Portsmouth

Rules changes
On 25 April 2012, it was announced that financial fair play rules would be introduced for teams within The Championship. This means that clubs have agreed to new rules on sustainable financing which includes:

 Acceptable losses of £4 million in the 2011–12 and 2012–13 seasons, reducing to £2 million in 2015–16 season
 Acceptable amounts of shareholder investment of £8 million in the 2011–12 season, £6 million in the 2012–13 season, reducing to £3 million in 2015–16 season
 New rules on providing accounts
 New penalties for teams that fail to abide by the rules

Also the 2011–12 season saw Football League clubs vote for five substitutes instead of seven. However, on 1 June 2012, Football League clubs re-voted with the outcome of seven substitutes instead of five, ahead of the 2012–13 Football League season.

Team overview

Stadia and locations

Personnel and sponsoring

Managerial changes

 23 Managerial changes ~ 12 sacked + 5 changed club + 3 resigned + 2 mutual consent + 1 contract finished

League table
A total of 24 teams contest the division: 18 sides remaining in the division from last season, three relegated from the Premier League, and three promoted from the League One.

Play-offs

Results

Season statistics

Top scorers

– includes two goals for Huddersfield Town
– includes eleven goals for Millwall
– includes two goals in the play-offs
– includes one goal in the play-offs

Assists

– includes one assist in the play-offs

Penalties

– includes one penalty for Huddersfield Town

Hat-tricks

 4 Player scored 4 goals

Scoring
First goal of the season: Mark Hudson for Cardiff City against Huddersfield Town (17 August 2012)
Fastest goal of the season: 30 seconds, Glenn Murray for Crystal Palace against Sheffield Wednesday (1 September 2012)
Latest goal of the season: 98 minutes and 23 seconds, Troy Deeney for Watford against Leeds United (10 November 2012)
Largest winning margin: 6 goals
Blackpool 6–0 Ipswich Town (25 August 2012)
Leicester City 6–0 Ipswich Town (17 November 2012)
Barnsley 0–6 Charlton Athletic (13 April 2013)
Highest scoring game: 9 goals
Charlton Athletic 5–4 Cardiff City (6 November 2012)
Peterborough United 5–4 Bolton Wanderers (22 December 2012)
Most goals scored in a match by a single team: 6 goals
Blackpool 6–0 Ipswich Town (25 August 2012)
Leeds United 1–6 Watford (10 November 2012)
Leicester City 6–0 Ipswich Town (17 November 2012)
Leicester City 6–1 Huddersfield Town (1 January 2013)
Nottingham Forest 6–1 Huddersfield Town (19 February 2013)
Barnsley 0–6 Charlton Athletic (13 April 2013)
Brighton & Hove Albion 6–1 Blackpool (20 April 2013)
Most goals scored in a match by a losing team: 4 goals
Charlton Athletic 5–4 Cardiff City (6 November 2012)
Peterborough United 5–4 Bolton Wanderers (22 December 2012)

Clean sheets
Most clean sheets: 18
Cardiff City
Fewest clean sheets: 5
Bristol City

Discipline
Most yellow cards (club): 93
Sheffield Wednesday
Most yellow cards (player): 13
Shane Lowry (Millwall)
Most red cards (club): 5
Nottingham Forest
Watford
Wolverhampton Wanderers
Most red cards (player): 2
Adlène Guedioura (Nottingham Forest)
Nikola Žigić (Birmingham City)

Monthly awards

Final day of the season
The final day of the season fell on 4 May 2013. Watford and Hull City were both fighting for 2nd place and automatic promotion to the 2013–14 Premier League. Crystal Palace, Leicester City, Bolton Wanderers and Nottingham Forest were all fighting for 5th and 6th place, and for a play-off spot. However, on the final day, it was mathematically possible for any 2 of 7 teams to get relegated alongside already relegated Bristol City. These teams were Wolverhampton Wanderers, Peterborough United, Huddersfield Town, Blackburn Rovers, Millwall, Barnsley and Sheffield Wednesday.

Late drama occupied all three battles, with the headlines inevitably going to Hull, who won promotion to the Premier League after a 2–2 draw with newly crowned champions Cardiff City and Watford being beaten 2–1 by Leeds United. Hull were 2–1 up and in the 91st minute when they were awarded a penalty which could have sealed their 2nd place spot. Hull missed their penalty and in the 93rd minute, Cardiff were awarded a penalty, which was converted by Nicky Maynard, bringing the score to 2–2. After a serious injury delayed the match, the Watford game was fifteen minutes behind the other games, so with the score at 1–1, Watford knew that a win would secure their promotion to the Premier League. In the 89th minute Leeds scored to make it 2–1. The scores stayed that way and promotion for Hull was assured.

In the play-off battle between Leicester City, Crystal Palace, Nottingham Forest and Bolton, there was a late goal for Leicester (vs Nottingham Forest) that secured a 3–2 victory, meaning that the 2–2 draw between Bolton Wanderers and Blackpool left them in 6th place. As the other results turned out, Crystal Palace would have remained in 5th place with a loss, but also scored late on to beat Peterborough 3–2. This left Bolton in 7th place, missing out on play-offs via goal difference.

The relegation battle ended in disappointment for Wolves and Peterborough. The late goal for Crystal Palace against Peterborough meant that a 1–1 draw was enough for Blackburn, a 2–0 win for Sheffield Wednesday over Middlesbrough was enough to secure their safety, a 1–0 defeat for Millwall against Derby County was enough for them and a 2–2 draw between Huddersfield and Barnsley was enough for both teams. Wolves lost 2–0 to Brighton, having started the day in the most difficult situation of the threatened teams.

References 

 
EFL Championship seasons
1
2
Eng